Jackson Timothy Brundage (born January 21, 2001) is a retired American actor. He is best known for his portrayal of Jamie Scott on The CW's One Tree Hill, a role he held from 2008 until the series' conclusion in 2012. Brundage was in the Nick at Nite sitcom, See Dad Run starring Scott Baio which lasted from 2012 to 2015. He was the first voice of Foo in the Nickelodeon series Harvey Beaks before being replaced by Tom Robinson. He has performed in film, television, and voice over. He played Charlie Allan Smith in Lime Salted Love. He also voiced Pablo in Einstein Pals. He retired from acting in 2015.

Personal life
Brundage was born in Los Angeles, California. He is the middle child of three and has an older sister named Alexuh Jayquelin and a younger brother named Camden Parkor.

Filmography

References

External links

2001 births
Living people
21st-century American male actors
American male voice actors
American male child actors
American male television actors
Male actors from Los Angeles